Karpas is one of the traditional rituals in the Passover Seder. It refers to the vegetable, usually parsley or celery, that is dipped in liquid (usually salt water) and eaten. Other customs are to use raw onion, or boiled potato. Some say the word comes from the Greek karpos meaning a fresh raw vegetable. It is more likely though that it is related to the Persian  "karafs" meaning celery (Persian: کرفس). The standard pronunciation karpas may be a corruption which developed due to a misidentification between this and a similar word found in Esther 1:6 which means fine linen, originally though it was pronounced "karafs". The karpas is traditionally placed on the seder plate on the left side, below the roasted egg. The liquid is usually salt-water or wine vinegar. The idea behind the salt water is to symbolize the salty tears that the Jews shed in their slavery in Egypt.

One reason given for dipping a vegetable into saltwater is to provoke children to ask about it, as per the theme of the Seder night that the story is to be recounted by way of question and answer. Dipping a vegetable prior to the main meal is not usually done at other occasions, and thus arouses the curiosity of the children. There is a second ceremonial dipping later in the Seder, when maror is dipped into the charoset. Hence one of the Four Questions, traditionally sung by the youngest at the Seder table, asks why "on all other nights we do not dip vegetables even once, on this night, we dip twice." 

Some have explained the dipping of the Karpas into salt water to symbolize Joseph's tunic being dipped into blood by his brothers. Karpas is therefore done at the beginning of the seder, just as Joseph's tunic being dipped into blood began the Israelites' descent to Egypt. Indeed, the Greek word 'karpos' is very similar to the Hebrew loan word from Old Persian 'karpas' meaning fine linen. The second dipping some say reminds us of the dipping of hyssop into lambs blood and painted on the doorposts so the angel of death would passover that house.

References

External links
Why Does the Seder Begin with Karpas? By Gilad J. Gevaryahu & Michael Wise (PDF)
Etymology of "karpas"
 Rabbi Eliezer Melamed, Peninei Halakha Laws Of Pesach, pp. 277–80, Karpas

Passover foods
Passover seder
Jewish ceremonial food and drink

fr:Karpass